Sani is a surname. Notable people with the surname include: 

Acryl Sani Abdullah Sani (born 1961), Malaysian police officer
Atsidi Sani (c. 1830 – c. 1870 or 1918), Navajo silversmith
Dino Sani (born 1932), Brazilian football player and coach
Engelberd Sani (born 1990), Indonesian football player
Fátima Djarra Sani (born 1968), Guinea-Bissau feminist activist, particularly against female genital mutilation 
Gideon Sani (born 1990), Nigerian football player
Hassan Sani (born 1958), Malaysian football player
Miftah Anwar Sani (born 1995), Indonesian football player
Omar Sani (born 1968), Bangladeshi actor
Shehu Sani (born 1967), Nigerian senator, author, playwright and human rights activist
Tina Sani, Pakistani singer
Uba Sani (born 1970), Nigerian politician
Umar Sani (born 1963), Nigerian politician